Alexander Allan Cameron KC (born 27 August 1963) is an English barrister.

Early life
Alexander Cameron is the elder son of stockbroker Ian Donald Cameron (12 October 1932 – 8 September 2010) and his wife Mary Fleur (born Mount, 1934). His younger brother is David Cameron, the former British Prime Minister. Alexander was educated at Eton College and the University of Bristol (LLB), and was called to the bar from the Inner Temple in 1986.

Career
On 31 October 2013, he appeared in some of the first television footage to be broadcast from the Court of Appeal of England and Wales since 1925, according to ITV. Sky News reported that he was the first barrister to be shown on television arguing a case in the Court of Appeal. It happened on the first day cameras were allowed into the court after a ban of 90 years. Cameron said "It's surprising. I only found out yesterday it was happening." The Guardian characterized him as "making television history".

In 2014 he appeared pro bono for the defence in a fraud trial, where the judge halted the trial on the grounds that the defendants could not receive a properly funded defence for a lengthy complex trial.

Some of his high-profile cases include heading the legal chambers that represented Rebekah Brooks in a phone hacking defence.

He is a member of White's.

Ancestry

References

1963 births
Living people
People from West Berkshire District
Alumni of the University of Bristol
People educated at Eton College
Members of the Inner Temple
English King's Counsel
British monarchists
Alexander
English barristers